The Kazakhstan women's national water polo team is the representative for Kazakhstan in international women's water polo.

Results

Olympic Games

2000 — 6th place
2004 — 8th place

World Championship

1994 — 12th place
1998 — 12th place
2001 — 8th place
2003 — 13th place
2007 — 13th place
2009 — 14th place
2011 — 13th place
2013 — 11th place
2015 — 12th place
2017 — 15th place
2019 — 10th place
2022 – 11th place

References

External links
Official website

Women's national water polo teams